The 6 Metre was a sailing event on the Sailing at the 1928 Summer Olympics program in Amsterdam. Seven races were scheduled. 61 sailors, on 13 boats, from 13 nations competed.

Race schedule

Course area and course configuration 
For the 6 Metre the used courses were about 5 nm out of the locks, East of the Isle of Marken on the Zuiderzee.

At that time the Zuiderzee had an open connection with the North Sea. The sea water was salt or at best brackish. Waves could be steep and short due to the shallow waters.

Weather conditions

Results 
The 1928 Olympic scoring system was used.

Final results

Daily standings

Notes 
 For this event one yacht from each country, manned by 5 amateurs maximum (maximum number of substitutes 5) was allowed.
 This event was a gender independent event. However it turned out to be a man's only event.

Other information 
During the Sailing regattas at the 1928 Summer Olympics among others the following persons were competing in the various classes:

Further reading 
 
 
"Olympics, 1928". International Six Metre Archive. Retrieved 25 January 2021.

References 

6 Metre
6 Metre (keelboat)